The Richard Tapia Celebration of Diversity in Computing Conference is a conference designed to promote diversity, connect undergraduate and graduate students, faculty, researchers, and professionals in computing from all backgrounds and ethnicities. The conferences are sponsored by the Association for Computing Machinery (ACM), and presented by the Center for Minorities and People with Disabilities in Information Technology (CMD-IT). The conferences are named after Professor Richard Tapia. Tapia is an internationally acclaimed scientist, a member of the National Academy of Engineering, the first recipient of the Computing Research Association's A. Nico Habermann Award for outstanding contributions to aiding members of underrepresented groups within the computing community, a member of the National Science Board, and recipient of the Presidential Award for Excellence in Science, Mathematics, and Engineering Mentoring from President Bill Clinton.

Conference structure
The Richard Tapia Celebration consists of three tracks: technical sessions, professional development, and broadening participation. These three tracks include Birds of a Feather sessions, workshops, panels, posters, and a Doctoral Consortium. Since 2017, the Celebration also serves as one of the ACM Student Research Competition sites.

Richard A. Tapia Achievement Award
The Richard A. Tapia Achievement Award for Scientific Scholarship, Civic Science and Diversifying Computing is awarded at the Celebration to individuals who have made significant contributions to broadening participation in computer science.

Past recipients:
 2019 - Christina Villalobos
 2018 - Ayanna Howard
2017 - Manuel Pérez-Quiñones
2016 - David Patterson
 2015 - Richard E. Ladner
 2014 - Janice E. Cuny
 2013 - Juan E. Gilbert
 2011 - William Wulf
 2009 - Ann Gates
 2007 - Peter Freeman
 2005 - Valerie Taylor
 2003 - Carlos Castillo-Chavez
 2001 - Bryant York

List of Conferences
Past conferences include:

See also
CMD-IT
Richard Tapia
Association for Computing Machinery (ACM)
Coalition to Diversify Computing
Grace Hopper Celebration of Women in Computing

References

External links
 ACM Richard Tapia Celebration of Diversity in Computing

Computer conferences
Diversity in computing
Association for Computing Machinery conferences